Double Dan may refer to:
 Double Dan (novel), a 1924 novel by Edgar Wallace
 Double Dan (play), a 1927 stage adaptation of Wallace's novel